South Carolina Highway 763 (SC 763) is a  state highway in the U.S. state of South Carolina. The highway connects Wedgefield and Sumter, via Cane Savannah and Millwood. It is signed north-south, but it travels east-west.

Route description
SC 763 begins at an intersection with SC 261 (South Kings Highway) in Wedgefield, Sumter County. It travels to the east-northeast, paralleling railroad tracks along its way. At the intersection with Tillman Nursery Road, it begins traveling along the northern edge of the Manchester State Forest. At the intersection with Bullett Road, SC 763 leaves Wedgefield proper and begins skirting along the northern edge of the town. At Burnt Gin Road, it begins to travel along another section of the state forest. The highway stays along the edge of the forest for just under . When the highway crosses Cane Savannah Creek, it leaves Wedgefield and begins to travel along the northern edge of Cane Savannah. It crosses Hatchet Camp Branch. Just before it intersects St. Pauls Church Road, it curves to the northeast, leaves Cane Savannah, and crosses over the railroad tracks it parallels from its southern terminus. It heads to the east-southeast and travels through a small section of the city limits of Sumter. The highway then enters Millwood. It travels in a more easterly direction and intersects the western terminus of SC 441 (Loring Mill Road). Just before Wildwood Avenue, it leaves Millwood and re-enters Sumter. It then turns left onto SC 120 (Pinewood Road) just northeast of Millwood Elementary School. The two highways travel concurrently to the northeast. They cross over Second Millpond and split at Alice Drive. SC 763 travels through the Iris Gardens and crosses over Swan Lake. At Guignard Drive is an intersection with U.S. Route 521 (US 521). At Washington Street, US 76 Business (US 76 Bus.) starts a concurrency with SC 763. Five blocks later, they intersect US 15 (Lafayette Drive). They cross over some railroad tracks and split just north of Eastwood Park. SC 763 travels along the southern edge of East Sumter until it meets its northern terminus, a partial interchange with US 378 (Robert E. Graham Freeway/Myrtle Beach Highway).

Major intersections

See also

References

External links

SC 763 South Carolina Hwy Index

763
Transportation in Sumter County, South Carolina